Mina Forsyth (September 20, 1921 in Estevan, Saskatchewan – 1987 in Saskatoon, Saskatchewan) was a Canadian artist. She is known for her expressionist and abstract landscapes, figural works and still life paintings.

Education
In 1955 Mina Forsyth received a Bachelor of Fine Arts degree from the University of Manitoba. She also had an MA from Michigan State University, which she received in 1957. In Michigan State she studied under Abraham Rattner. Forsyth attended the Emma Lake Artists' Workshops in 1955, 1965, 1966 and 1967.

Career
During the 1950s, 60s, 70s, and 80s, Forsyth attended many workshops at Emma Lake Artist's Workshops at Murray Point, Saskatchewan, studying with artists such as Jack Shadbolt, Jules Olitski, Lawrence Alloway, Harold Cohen, Frank Stella, Walter Darby Bannard, John McLean, Tim Hilton, and Terry Atkinson. Forsyth also attended the Banff Centre for the Arts and the Gimli Summer School in Gimli, Manitoba.

Forsyth was a guest artist at an Emma Lake workshop in 1977 and worked at the University of Saskatchewan as professor emeritus and as an art instructor until she retired in 1985. In 1991, Forsyth received a posthumous Lifetime Achievement Award from the Saskatchewan Arts Board.

Exhibitions
Selected Group Exhibitions
 1949 - Banff School of Fine Arts, Banff, Alberta, Banff Travelling Exhibit
 - Hudson's Bay Company, Winnipeg, Manitoba, Young Contemporaries
 1967 - Norman Mackenzie Art Gallery, Regina, Saskatchewan, Saskatchewan Centennial Exhibition (curated by Clement Greenberg)
 1972 - Mendal Art Gallery, Saskatoon, Saskatchewan, Drawings by Eight Painters
 1974 - R.C. Dahl National Exhibition Center, Swift Current, Saskatchewan, Contemporary Saskatchewan Paintings & Sculpture
 1976 - Dunlop Art Gallery, Regina Public Library, Regina, Saskatchewan

Selected Solo Exhibitions
 1957 - Michigan State University, East Lansing, Michigan, Graduate Exhibition
 1968 - Marquis Gallery, University of Saskatchewan, Saskatoon, Saskatchewan
 1975 - Shoestring Gallery, Saskatoon, Saskatchewan
 1977 - Frances Morrison Library Gallery, Saskatoon, Saskatchewan
 1979 - Shoestring Gallery, Saskatoon, Saskatchewan
- Regina Modern Dance Works
- Lea Collins Gallery, Regina, Saskatchewan
- Rosemont Art Gallery, Regina, Saskatchewan
 1981 - Gallery One, Saskatoon, SK, Six Tenant Farmers and Other Works
 1982 - Gordon Snelgrove Art Gallery, University of Saskatchewan, Saskatoon, Saskatchewan
 1985 - Mendel Art Gallery, Saskatoon, Saskatchewan, Mina Forsyth: Flowers and Heads

Accolades
Awards
 1954 - Winnipeg Show Student Prize, University of Manitoba, Winnipeg, Manitoba
 1955 - Saskatchewan Jubilee Prize for Painting, Government of Saskatchewan, Regina, Saskatchewan
 1965 - Second Prize, Saskatchewan and Canadian Centennial Poetry Competition

References

Sources 
"Mina Mabel Forsyth" Saskatchewan Council for Archives and Archivists. Retrieved 2016-02-26.
"Forsyth, Mina Mabel" Canadian Women Artists. Retrieved 2016-02-26.
"Mina Forsyth fonds" SAIN Collections. Retrieved 2016-02-26.

1920 births
1987 deaths
20th-century Canadian women artists
20th-century Canadian artists
Artists from Saskatchewan
Michigan State University alumni
People from Estevan
University of Manitoba alumni
Canadian expatriates in the United States